Alexandros Karageorgiou (born 3 June 1986) is an archer from Greece. He competed at the 2004 Summer Olympics.

Karageorgiou placed 33rd in the men's individual ranking round with a 72-arrow score of 647.  He then defeated the 32nd-ranked Tarundeep Rai of India in a minor upset, 147-143, in the first round of elimination.

Karageorgiou was also a member of the 13th-place Greek men's archery team at the 2004 Summer Olympics.

References

1986 births
Living people
Greek male archers
Archers at the 2004 Summer Olympics
Olympic archers of Greece
Archers at the 2015 European Games
European Games competitors for Greece
Archers at the 2019 European Games
21st-century Greek people